Agromyces aureus is a Gram-negative, rod-shaped and motile bacterium from the genus of Agromyces which has been isolated from the rhizosphere of the tree Salix caprea from Arnoldstein in Austria.

References 

Microbacteriaceae
Bacteria described in 2016